Eilema homochroma is a moth of the subfamily Arctiinae first described by Hervé de Toulgoët in 1957. It is found on Madagascar.

Subspecies
Eilema homochroma homochroma
Eilema homochroma ambrensis Toulgoët, 1971

References

homochroma